Silvia Navarro Giménez (born 20 March 1979) is a Spanish handball goalkeeper for BM Remudas and the Spanish national team.

She holds two bronze medals from the 2011 World Championships and 2012 London Summer Olympics.

Club
Navarro Gimenez followed ex-teammate Alexandrina Cabral Barbosa and signed for Romanian top club Vâlcea in May 2012.

International championships
She competed internationally at the 2010 European Women's Handball Championship, where the Spain placed 11th, and Navarro was listed among the top ten goalkeepers of the championship with a rate of 39%.

She competed at the 2011 World Women's Handball Championship, where the Spain placed 3rd, and Navarro was listed first among the top ten goalkeepers of the championship with a rate of 46%.

At the 2012 Summer Olympics, Span won the bronze medal, Silvia Navarro was listed 4th among the top ten goalkeepers of the championship with a rate of 37%.

Honours
Club
EHF Champions League:
Finalist: 2011
Semi-finalist: 2013
EHF Cup:
Winner: 2009
Finalist: 2008

National team
World Championship:
Bronze Medallist: 2011
European Championship:
Silver Medallist: 2008
Olympics:
Bronze Medallist: 2012

Individual awards
Carpathian Trophy Best Goalkeeper: 2013
Bronze Medal of the Royal Order of Sports Merit

References

External links

1979 births
Living people
Sportspeople from Valencia
Spanish female handball players
Expatriate handball players
Spanish expatriate sportspeople in Romania
Handball players at the 2012 Summer Olympics
Handball players at the 2016 Summer Olympics
Olympic handball players of Spain
SCM Râmnicu Vâlcea (handball) players
Olympic medalists in handball
Olympic bronze medalists for Spain
Medalists at the 2012 Summer Olympics
Handball players at the 2020 Summer Olympics
Mediterranean Games competitors for Spain
Competitors at the 2009 Mediterranean Games